Gilberto Kassab ( or ; born 12 August 1960) is a Brazilian politician and former mayor of São Paulo. His term ended in 2012. A civil engineer and economist, one of the most famous Brazilians of Syrian descent, Kassab took over from José Serra, after Serra decided to run for governor of São Paulo.

He belongs to the Syrian community of São Paulo, and is a member of the Partido Social Democrático (PSD). He is mentioned in 2017 among the beneficiaries of bribes from the multinational JBS.

Political career
1993–1994: Councillor of São Paulo
1995–1999: State Deputy of São Paulo
1999–2004: Federal Deputy (resigned to run as vice mayor of São Paulo alongside José Serra)
2005–2006: Vice Mayor of São Paulo
2006–2013: Mayor of São Paulo (re-elected on 26 Oct 2008 for a four-year term)

Administration
The advertising industry criticized the city of São Paulo administration for the Cidade Limpa law, which prohibits all forms of external media and visual pollution such as billboards. Ad companies tried to keep the billboards in the streets with injunctions, but the supreme court determined the law to be constitutional. At any rate, support for the initiative from the public continues to be widespread.

Appearance in The Greatest Movie Ever Sold
Mayor Kassab appeared at length in the Morgan Spurlock 2011 documentary The Greatest Movie Ever Sold talking about the decision of the City Council to ban advertising in the city.

2022 presidential bid
In July 2021, Kassab announced that he would support Rodrigo Pacheco in the 2022 presidential election.

Car Wash Operation

The biggest implicated company, Odebrecht kept an entire department to coordinate the payment of bribe to politicians. In the Car Wash Operation, officers seized several electronic spreadsheets linking the payments to nicknames. Every corrupt politician received a nickname based on physical characteristics, public trajectory, personal infos, owned cars/boats, origin place or generic preferences. Gilberto Kassab's nickname was 'Chefe Turco' and 'Kibe', portuguese form of 'Turkish Boss' and 'Kibbeh', respectively, alusing his Middle East ancestry.

References

External links
Official page (Portuguese)
BBC News article about Cidade Limpa
Folha de S.Paulo first page with a before-after picture (Portuguese)
CityMayors profile (much incorrect information)

|-

|-

|-

|-

1960 births
Living people
People from São Paulo
Brazilian people of Syrian descent
Brazilian people of Italian descent
Liberal Party (Brazil, 1985) politicians
Democrats (Brazil) politicians
Social Democratic Party (Brazil, 2011) politicians
Government ministers of Brazil
Members of the Chamber of Deputies (Brazil) from São Paulo
Members of the Legislative Assembly of São Paulo
Mayors of São Paulo
University of São Paulo alumni
Ministers of Science and Technology of Brazil